The 2019–20 II liga was the 72nd season of the third tier domestic division in the Polish football league system since its establishment in 1948 and the 12th season of the Polish II liga under its current title. The league was operated by the PZPN. The league was contested by 18 teams. The regular season was played in a round-robin tournament. The season started on 27 July 2019 and concluded on 25 July 2020 (regular season). On 13 March 2020, the PZPN suspended the league due to the outbreak of COVID-19 pandemic. After consultation with the Polish government, the league resumed behind closed doors without any spectators on 3 June 2020.

Changes from last season
The following teams have changed division since the 2018–19 season.

To II liga
Relegated from 2018–19 I liga
 Bytovia Bytów
 GKS Katowice
 Garbarnia Kraków
Promoted from 2018–19 III liga
 Legionovia Legionowo (Group 1)
 Lech Poznań II (Group 2)
 Górnik Polkowice (Group 3)
 Stal Rzeszów (Group 4)

From II liga
Promoted to 2019–20 I liga
 Radomiak Radom
 Olimpia Grudziądz
 GKS Bełchatów
Relegated to 2019–20 III liga
 Siarka Tarnobrzeg
 ROW 1964 Rybnik
 Rozwój Katowice
 Ruch Chorzów

Team overview

Stadiums and locations

Effects of the COVID-19 pandemic

League table

Promotion play-offs
II liga play-offs for the 2019–20 season will be played in July 2020. The teams who finished in 3rd, 4th, 5th and 6th place are set to compete. The fixtures are determined by final league position – 3rd team of regular season vs 6th team of regular season and 4th team of regular season vs 5th team of regular season. The winner of final match will be promoted to I liga for next season. All matches will be played in a stadiums of team which occupied higher position in regular season.

See also
 2019–20 Ekstraklasa
 2019–20 I liga
 2019–20 III liga
 2019–20 Polish Cup

Notes

References

External links
 

2019-20
2019–20 in Polish football
Poland
II liga